Several British merchant vessels have borne the name Tarleton, several of which were associated with the Tarleton family of Liverpool who for three generations engaged in the slave trade:
  was built in France in 1778. By 1780 she was in English hands and trading between Liverpool and Jamaica. Between 1785 and 1788 she made two voyages as a slaver. She foundered on 28 November 1788 off St David's Head on her way from Liverpool to Africa.  
 Tarleton, of 130 tons (bm), entered Lloyd's Register in 1779 with owner and master J. Devereux, and trade London-New York. Early listings gave her year of launch as 1776, and the place as New York. However, by 1783, her place of launch was given as Virginia. Also, there are indications that she may have originally borne the name Saratoga. During the war years her armament was four 4-pounder and four 6-pounder guns. She was last listed in 1786.
  was launched at Glasgow in 1780. She was a privateer and merchantman that the French captured in 1782 in the Caribbean, and took into the French Navy. They took her back to France where she served in the Mediterranean. The British captured her at the Siege of Toulon and took her into service as HMS Tarleton, but sold her in 1796 as unfit for further service.  
  was launched in 1789 at Liverpool for Tarleton & Co. She was a West Indiaman but also made a voyage as a privateer and another as a slave ship. The French captured her in 1797 after she had landed her slaves. She returned to British ownership c. 1803 and traded generally until she wrecked at the Cape of Good Hope in April 1818.
  was launched in 1796 at Liverpool for Tarleton & Co. She made two voyages as a slave ship before she was lost at Cape Palmas in late 1798.

See also
  - vessel named for Banastre Tarleton

Notes

Citations

References
 

Ship names
Age of Sail merchant ships
Merchant ships of the United Kingdom